John Francis Ferry (April 7, 1887 – August 29, 1954) was a pitcher in Major League Baseball. He played for the Pittsburgh Pirates.

References

External links

1887 births
1954 deaths
Major League Baseball pitchers
Pittsburgh Pirates players
Jersey City Skeeters players
Columbus Senators players
Shreveport Gassers players
Baseball players from Massachusetts
Sportspeople from Pittsfield, Massachusetts
Columbus Pawnees players
Seton Hall Pirates baseball players